Ștefan Răzvan Orza (born 12 April 2001) is a Romanian professional undefeated kickboxer, and former kempo practitioner, freestyle wrestler and mixed martial artist. He currently competes in the Welterweight division for Glory. 

A professional competitor since 2017, Orza formerly competed in the Colosseum Tournament, in which he was the reigning champion of the welterweight division. A two-time Kempo Junior World Champion, he has a background in the disciplines of kenpō, mixed martial arts, freestyle wrestling and freestyle kickboxing.

As of 1 November 2022, Orza is ranked the #10 welterweight in the world by Beyond Kick.

Professional kickboxing career

Early career
Orza began his professional fighting career in 2017, making his debut in Constanța-based Urban Legend. From 2019 he fought in parallel in OSS Fighters, later signing with the popular Dynamite Fighting Show in 2022. He debuted for the promotion against the former Colosseum Tournament World Super Lightweight Champion Andrei Ostrovanu, winning via unanimous decision. He amassed a perfect 15–0 record prior to joining the rival promotion Colosseum Tournament.

Colosseum Tournament
In July 2022, it was announced that Orza would be participating in the Colosseum Tournament Welterweight Contender Tournament. He was scheduled to face former Colosseum Tournament welterweight title challenger Anghel Cardoş in the semifinal round at Colosseum Tournament 34 on August 18. Orza won the bout via unanimous decision. In the finals of the Colosseum Tournament Welterweight Contender Tournament later that night, Orza won a unanimous decision over Mădălin Crăciunică.

Orza faced Alexandru Amariței for the Colosseum Tournament World Welterweight Championship on 21 October 2022, in the main event of Colosseum Tournament 36. In a largely one-sided affair, Orza won the fight via unanimous decision.

Orza amassed a record of 18–0 prior to joining Glory.

GLORY
Orza is expected to make his promotional debut on 11 March 2023 at GLORY 84.

Personal life
His father was a fireman and Ștefan aspired to be a firefighter. Therefore, as of January 2021, he works as a firefighter at the Neptun Department in addition to his fighting career.

Championships and accomplishments

Kickboxing
Colosseum Tournament  
Colosseum Tournament World Welterweight Championship (One time)
2022 Colosseum Tournament Welterweight Contender Tournament Winner

Kempo 
Romanian Kempo Federation 
2019 FRK Romanian Senior Semi-Kempo and Full-Kempo Cup in Bucharest Full-Kempo Rules  −70.0 kg 

United World Sport Kempo Federation
2019 UWSKF World Junior Kempo Championship in Budapest, Hungary Full-Kempo Rules  −71.0 kg
2019 UWSKF World Junior Kempo Championship in Budapest, Hungary Knock-down Rules  −71.0 kg 

International Kempo Federation 
2017 IKF European Junior Kempo Championships in Bucharest, Romania Full-Kempo Rules  −65.0 kg

Freestyle wrestling 
Romanian Wrestling Federation
2018 FRL Romania Cadet Beach Wrestling National Championships in Constanța-Mangalia  −70.0 kg
2016 International Beach Wrestling Tournament Ion Cornianu & Ladislau Simon in Bucharest, Romania

Freestyle kickboxing 
World Kickboxing Association
2016 FRFK European WKA-WTKA Boys Championship in Bucharest, Romania Freestyle K-1 Light  −50.0 kg

Mixed martial arts 
Romanian Kempo Federation 
2019 FRK Romania Junior National Grappling UWW and MMA Championships in Bucharest MMA Rules  −70.0 kg

Professional kickboxing record

|- style="background:#fbb
| 2023-03-11 || Loss || align=left| Chico Kwasi || GLORY 84 || Rotterdam, Netherlands || TKO (Knee to the body) || 2 || 3:00 || 18-1-0
|-
|-  bgcolor="#cfc
| 2022-10-21 || Win ||align=left| Alexandru Amariței  || Colosseum Tournament 36 || Botoșani, Romania || Decision (unanimous) || 5 || 3:00 || 18-0-0
|-
! style=background:white colspan=9 |
|-
|-  bgcolor="#cfc
| 2022-08-18 || Win ||align=left| Mădălin Crăciunică || Colosseum Tournament 34 - Welterweight Contender Tournament, Final || Brașov, Romania || Decision (unanimous) || 3 || 3:00 || 17-0-0
|-
! style=background:white colspan=9 |
|- 
|-  bgcolor="#cfc
| 2022-08-18 || Win ||align=left| Anghel Cardoş || Colosseum Tournament 34 - Welterweight Contender Tournament, Semi Finals || Brașov, Romania || Decision (unanimous) || 3 || 3:00 || 16-0-0
|-
|-  bgcolor="#cfc"
| 2022-05-06 || Win ||align=left| Andrei Ostrovanu || Dynamite Fighting Show 14 || Bucharest, Romania || Decision (unanimous) || 3 || 3:00 || 15-0-0  
|-
|-  bgcolor="#cfc"
| 2021-11-19 || Win ||align=left| Cezar Buzdugan || OSS Fighters 07 || Constanța, Romania || Decision (unanimous) || 3 || 3:00 || 14-0-0  
|-
|-  bgcolor="#cfc"
| 2021-07-16 || Win ||align=left| Valentin Pascali || OSS Fighters 06 || Constanța, Romania || KO (punches and knee) || 2 || 2:57 || 13-0-0  
|- 
|-  bgcolor="#cfc"
| 2020-02-07 || Win ||align=left| Serghei Zanosiev || OSS Fighters 5 || Bucharest, Romania || Decision (unanimous) || 3 || 3:00 || 12-0-0  
|-  
|-  bgcolor="#cfc"
| 2019-12-15 || Win ||align=left| Costel Răşcanu || Urban Legend 9 || Constanța, Romania || KO (knee and punch) || 1 || 1:00 || 11-0-0   
|- 
|-  bgcolor="#cfc"
| 2019-10-05 || Win ||align=left| Răzvan Vătavu || Urban Legend 8 || Constanța, Romania || KO (punch and knee) || 1 || 1:38 || 10-0-0  
|-  
|-  bgcolor="#cfc"
| 2019-08-22 || Win ||align=left| Călin Petrișor || OSS Fighters 4 || Mamaia, Romania || Decision (unanimous) || 3 || 3:00 || 9-0-0   
|- 
|-  bgcolor="#cfc"
| 2019-05-25 || Win ||align=left| Ionuţ Laszlo || Urban Legend 7: Romania vs. Netherlands || Constanța, Romania || KO (punches) || 2 || 1:41 || 8-0-0  
|- 
|-  bgcolor="#cfc"
| 2019-02-28 || Win ||align=left| Florin Pîrtea || OSS Fighters 3 || Bucharest, Romania || Decision (unanimous) || 3 || 3:00 || 7-0-0    
|-   
|-  bgcolor="#cfc"
| 2018-12-16 || Win ||align=left| Daniel Loghin || Urban Legend 6 || Constanța, Romania || KO (punches and knee) || 1 || 2:11 || 6-0-0  
|- 
|-  bgcolor="#cfc"
| 2018-09-30 || Win ||align=left| Marius Calara || Urban Legend 5 || Constanța, Romania || TKO (referee stoppage) || 2 || 0:28 || 5-0-0  
|-   
|-  bgcolor="#cfc"
| 2018-05-27 || Win ||align=left| Ciprian Piroteală || Urban Legend 4 || Constanța, Romania || KO (high kick and punch) || 1 || 1:43 || 4-0-0  
|- 
|-  bgcolor="#cfc"
| 2017-12-10 || Win ||align=left| Dragoş Burlacu || Urban Legend 3 || Constanța, Romania || KO (left hook) || 2 || 1:42 || 3-0-0  
|-  bgcolor="#cfc"
| 2017-08-24 || Win ||align=left| Alexandru Moisescu || Urban Legend 2 || Mamaia, Romania || Decision (unanimous) || 3 || 3:00 || 2-0-0  
|- 
|-
| colspan=9 | Legend:

See also
List of male kickboxers

References

External links
 Ștefan Orza at Tapology.com

2001 births
Living people 
People from Constanța County
Romanian male kickboxers 
Middleweight kickboxers  
Light heavyweight kickboxers
Kickboxing champions
Glory kickboxers
Romanian male sport wrestlers
Kenpō 
Eastern Orthodox Christians from Romania
21st-century Romanian people